In July and August 2021, a series of more than two hundred wildfires burnt 1,700 square kilometres of forest in Turkey's Mediterranean Region in the worst-ever wildfire season in the country's history. As of 9 August 2021, two fires were still burning, both in Muğla. The fires are part of a larger series of wildfires, including those in neighbouring Greece, originating from a heatwave made more likely by climate change.

Background 

Since the 1940's the number of fires per year had increased from around 1000 to around 3500. In 2007, the IPCC Fourth Assessment Report said that "Warmer, drier conditions will lead to more frequent and prolonged droughts, as well as to a longer fire season and increased fire risk, particularly in the Mediterranean region." The fires were some of several extreme weather events around the world in 2021.

Wildfires in the forests of Turkey are common in summer, principally in the Mediterranean and Aegean regions, however, May 2021 was the hottest May for over 50 years and followed a drought, made more likely by climate change. This was followed by near to above average June temperatures with positive temperature anomalies below  and ample rainfall, however, this did not impede the fires in Kaş, Tarsus and Marmaris on 26 and 27 June.

The fires
Copernicus satellites measured the maximum daily heat intensity at about 20 gigawatts, four times the previous record in Turkey, and EFFIS estimates placed the total area burnt at almost ten times the average for early August. Nine people died in the wildfires, at least two of them firefighters. Three deadly casualties were reported from the fire in Manavgat. 18 villages in Antalya and 16 villages in Adana and Mersin were evacuated. Most injuries were due to smoke inhalation. More than 4,000 tourists and staff in 2 hotels in Bodrum were evacuated by sea, by the Turkish Coastguard helped by private boats. Minister of Environment and Urban Planning Murat Kurum said that over 100 art museums would have to be demolished. The president declared parts of 5 southern provinces disaster zones. By the 2 August 2021, it was estimated that about 160'000 acres of forests have fallen victim to the fires.

During the first few days of August new fires broke out in the west, and the Kemerköy power plant in Muğla Province was evacuated on 4 August as a fire entered the plant. The same day some other people near Milas were evacuated by sea. Nearby Yeniköy power plant was also threatened by a fire. Rare summer rain in Antalya on 7 August helped bring the fires there under control, but those in Muğla remained serious, with 13 fires continuing in 5 provinces.

On August 14, a Russian Navy Beriev Be-200 fire-fighting plane, one of two hired since July to help those affected by the fires in Kahramanmaraş, crashed just before it was due to land. There were five Russian servicemen and three Turkish citizens on board, all of whom perished in the accident.

Most of the burnt forest was Turkish pine (Pinus brutia - in Turkish "Kızılçam" literally "red pine" - so sometimes mistranslated), which can generally regrow naturally.

Reactions

Domestic 
Agriculture and Forestry Minister Bekir Pakdemirli said in July that three planes, 38 helicopters and about 4,000 firefighters had fought the fires. Drones were also used, along with 485 water tenders and 660 bulldozers. He also stated that more than 2,000 farm animals had died.  The Disaster and Emergency Management Authority (AFAD) said on 29 July that 58 people were still in hospital. Ten people trapped at Oymapinar Dam were rescued. However, firefighting planes could only operate in daylight, and fallen trees blocked access to certain roads. On 3 August the Radio and Television Supreme Council warned media in Turkey not to be too negative in their coverage. Government loan repayments were postponed for the injured, and damage payments were made and interest-free credit promised to small businesses. Public access to various forests was banned until autumn. Opposition Republican People's Party (CHP) Chairman Kemal Kılıçdaroğlu argued that an adequate supply of planes is essential as most fires broke out on the steep foothills of the Taurus Mountains where planes would have been more efficient at keeping the fires under control, and criticised the government by claiming that it limited the ability of the Turkish Aeronautical Association to bid. Later on, he said that the president had been ignoring the climate crisis and drought in Turkey. The mayors of the eleven CHP governed metropolitans made a joint statement offering to finance the costs of firefighting planes. Other opposition parties also criticised the ministry: Selahattin Demirtaş of the Peoples' Democratic Party called the government incompetent, and Good Party leader Meral Akşener said she had warned the ministry about the lack of planes the previous year. Pakdemirli said the ministry would buy firefighting planes before the end of 2021. The Turkish Aeronautical Association said that the 5000 liter capacity limit for tenders for firefighting aircraft should have been lower so they could have bid, but the president said they should have updated their technology. The president said that municipalities are also responsible for firefighting, but mayors said they had not been invited to crisis coordination meetings.

In August, President Erdoğan, while busing through disaster areas, threw tea bags at citizens, which was criticized by several opposition politicians, including Ali Babacan who said the act was shameful.

International assistance  
The following countries responded:
  – 750 firefighters, 93 trucks, helicopter and plane 
  – 45 firefighters and 6 trucks
  – airplanes 
  – airplanes 
  – offer refused by Turkey
 – airplanes
  – airplanes 
 - In August 2021, the Astana Times reported that helicopters from Kazakhstan helped extinguish forest fires in southwest Turkey.  
  – airplanes 
  – airplanes 
  – airplanes
  – airplanes
  – S-70i helicopter
  – airplanes
  – 2 water dropping CH-47 Chinook helicopters

International Organizations:
  - 3 Canadairs from the  fleet

Seedling donation movement 
Specifically for 2021 Turkish wildfires, a non-governmental organization in Turkey, Çevre Kuruluşları Dayanışma Derneği ÇEKUD, has initiated seedling donation movement.

Following the defeat of Turkey women's national volleyball team by South Korea women's national volleyball team in quarterfinal at the 2020 Summer Olympics with set scores of 3 – 2, most of the players in Turkey women's national volleyball team bursted out their tears. After the reason of their sorrow has been known throughout the Internet, South Korean netizens initiated voluntary seedling donation movement through ÇEKUD in the name of Kim Yeon-koung or Korea Volleyball Federation to help Turkey for 2021 Turkish wildfires.

ÇEKUD began their work to establish Turkey-Korea Friendship Forest Areas in several damaged areas, beginning on November 18, 2021 in Antalya Province. On April 1, 2022, Turkey completed planting operation. According to ÇEKUD, six zones of "Turkey-Korea Friendship Forest" are made: 30,000 in Antalya, 40,000 in Nevşehir, 25,000 in Kilis, 15,000 in Istanbul, 30,000 in Muğla and 10,000 in Osmaniye, thus 150,000 donated trees among 580,000, in total.

Investigation of causes
, figures for 2020 fire starting have not yet been published by the General Directorate of Forestry, but in 2019 no fires were known to have been caused by terrorism, and in 2018, out of the 2167 total fires 6 are known to have been started by terrorists according to official statistics. However, what started almost half of the 2688 fires in 2019 was unknown: the most common known fire starters were lightning (372) and intentional stubble burning (184).

Boğaziçi University climatologist Levent Kurnaz said that the extremely hot and dry weather helped to start the fires. Some meteorologists also mention the foehn effect. Hikmet Özturk, forestry expert working with the Turkish Foundation for Combating Soil Erosion, said that although wildfires are almost always started by people, effects of climate change on wildfires are making their spread worse.

The state-run TRT World, among others, wrote quickly about the possibility of the Kurdistan Workers' Party (PKK, which is listed as a terrorist organization by Turkey and many other countries) being behind the fires. One article by TRT called the PKK the "prime suspect" because "environmental destruction is one of the methods of vengeance used by the group." This was denied by the PKK, as well as the Kurdistan Communities Union (KCK). According to some reports, there were racist attacks on Kurds after it was reported that the PKK was behind the fires.  Interior Minister Süleyman Soylu stated that they had "no security intelligence" yet to support the claim that wildfires were being caused by arson attacks.   official investigation concerning the causes of the fires continues, including possible arson or negligence.

Gallery

See also 
 2009 Mediterranean wildfires
 2021 Greece wildfires
 2021 Turkey floods

References

External links 
 Global Wildfire Information System (GWIS): Turkey

2021 disasters in Turkey
2021 fires in Asia
2021 in Turkey
Turkey wildfires
Aegean Region
Articles containing video clips
July 2021 events in Turkey
August 2021 events in Turkey
Firefighting in Turkey
Mediterranean Region, Turkey
Wildfires in Turkey
Climate change in Turkey
Effects of climate change